Wasquehal (traditional pronunciation ; currently common pronunciation ) is a commune in the Nord department in northern France.

The town originally had a Flemish name; it was written as Waskenhal in the 11th century.

Geography

Héraldique

Population

Sport
Wasquehal hosted the finish of stage 4 of the 1989 Tour de France, won by Jelle Nijdam, and the finish of stage 5 the 1992 Tour de France, won by Guido Bontempi. The third stage of the 2004 Tour de France also finished in Wasquehal. Jean-Patrick Nazon won the mass sprint ahead of Erik Zabel and Robbie McEwen. Wasquehal also hosted the start of stage 7 of the 1988 Tour de France, and the start of stage 3 of the 1996 Tour de France.

Twin towns – sister cities

Wasquehal is twinned with:
 Beyne-Heusay, Belgium

See also
ES Wasquehal
Communes of the Nord department

References

External links

 

Communes of Nord (French department)
French Flanders